Brisbane, Australia's third largest city, is home to at least 360 completed high-rise buildings, at least 70 high-rise buildings over 100 metres in height, and has 15 completed skyscrapers (and 4 under construction) which exceed the height of . With the third greatest number of skyscrapers in any city within Australia (behind Melbourne and Sydney), Brisbane boasts some of the tallest buildings in the country, including the city's current tallest, the  Brisbane Skytower, completed in 2019.

All of Brisbane's skyscrapers (defined as buildings with a height greater than 150 metres) are located within the CBD, with large numbers of high-rise buildings also proliferating in the inner suburbs of South Brisbane, Kangaroo Point, Fortitude Valley, Newstead, Teneriffe, New Farm, Bowen Hills, Spring Hill, Milton, Auchenflower, Toowong, Taringa, St Lucia, West End and Woolloongabba.

There is a  height limit for buildings in the CBD.

Brisbane's 91 metre City Hall was the city's tallest building for decades after its completion in 1930 and was finally surpassed in 1970 by the Westpac Building, which marked the beginning of the widespread construction of high-rise buildings over 100 metres in height. The city's first skyscraper with a height of over 150 metres was Central Plaza One, completed in 1988. Central Plaza One and Waterfront Place, completed in 1989, remained the city's only skyscrapers until the completion of the 200 metre Riparian Plaza in 2005, which has since been surpassed on numerous occasions in the widespread construction of skyscrapers which has been ongoing since the mid-2000s.

Brisbane plays host to other structures over 150 metres in height such as the five television transmission towers atop Mount Coot-tha and the Bald Hills Radiator transmission tower however these are not considered to be buildings as they are uninhabitable.

Tallest buildings 
This is a list of Brisbane's tallest completed and topped out buildings. Structures are not included. Official heights are ranked by the Council on Tall Buildings and Urban Habitat, and include spires but exclude communications masts and spires. All of the buildings that are listed are over 150m in height.

Under construction and proposed
This is a list of buildings currently under construction or proposed that are planned to reach 150 m in height.

Timeline of tallest buildings
This lists buildings that once held the title of "tallest building in Brisbane".

See also 

 List of tallest buildings on the Gold Coast
 List of tallest buildings in Oceania

References 

 
Brisbane
Landmarks in Brisbane
Lists of buildings and structures in Brisbane